Michelle Ugenti-Rita (born June 28, 1980) is an American politician and a former Republican member of the Arizona State Senate representing District 23 from 2019 to 2023. She previously served in the Arizona House of Representatives from 2013 to 2019. Ugenti served consecutively from January 10, 2011 until January 14, 2013 in the District 8 seat. She was a candidate for Secretary of State of Arizona in the 2022 election, but lost in the Republican primary.

Education
She attended Desert Mountain high school. Ugenti graduated from Arizona State University in 2003 with a degree in business administration.

Career
In 2017, Ugenti was the only Republican to oppose a 'Blue Lives Matter' bill that toughens penalties for assaulting off-duty police.

In January 2019, she sponsored legislation which would prohibit voters who received early vote ballots from casting those votes at polling places before or on election day (they would only be allowed to cast them through mail). Election officials from both parties, as well as voting rights advocates, opposed the legislation, saying that it solves no problem and with some saying it amounted to voter suppression. In 2018, about 228,000 voters had cast their early vote ballots on election day itself, but would be prohibited from doing so under the proposed law.

Ugenti has sponsored a number of bills making it harder to put ballot initiatives up to voters.

In 2021, she supported legislation that would require voters in Arizona who vote by mail to include identification paperwork along with their ballots. She also supported legislation that would purge registered voters from early voting vote rolls if they did not use early voting in two consecutive elections. Initially a supporter of the 2021 Maricopa County presidential ballot audit, she withdrew her support in July, 2021.

Elections
2010 With incumbent Democratic Representative David Bradley running for the Arizona Senate, Ugenti and Republican incumbent John Kavanagh ran in the six-way District 8 Primary; Ugenti placing second with 9,581 votes. In the November 2 General election, Kavanagh took the first seat, and Ugenti took the second seat with 38,055 votes against Democrat John Kriekard.
2012 Redistricted to District 23, and with incumbent Republican Representatives John Fillmore running for Arizona Senate and Frank Pratt redistricted to District 8, Ugenti ran in the three-way August 28, Republican Primary; Kavanagh placed first, and Ugenti placed second with 18,106 votes. Ugenti and Kavanagh were unopposed for the November 6, 2012 General election, with Ugenti taking the first seat with 68,827 votes.
2014 Michelle Ugenti and Jay Lawrence defeated Effie Carlson and Bob Littlefield in the Republican primary and were unchallenged in the general election.
2016 Ugenti and Jay Lawrence were unopposed in the Republican primary. They defeated Democrat Tammy Caputi on November 8. Ugenti  was the top vote getter in the election with 69,758 votes.
2018 Ugenti-Rita defeated two Republican challengers, taking 41.4% of the vote, in the 2018 primary. She defeated Democratic challenger Daria Lohman and Independent Christopher Leone with 57.1% of the vote.

References

External links

Official page at the Arizona State Legislature
Campaign site
 

1980 births
21st-century American politicians
21st-century American women politicians
Republican Party Arizona state senators
Arizona State University alumni
Living people
Republican Party members of the Arizona House of Representatives
Place of birth missing (living people)
Politicians from Scottsdale, Arizona
Right-wing politics in the United States
Women state legislators in Arizona